Zoran Samardžija (born 6 December 1962) is a Bosnian-Herzegovinian retired footballer and FIFA players agent.

Club career
He started playing in the youth teams of FK Željezničar. Than made his senior debut in the 1979–80 season, under the guidance of club's manager Ivica Osim. With Željezničar he had reached the semi-finals of the 1984–85 UEFA Cup. He scored crucial goals against FC Universitatea Craiova in the fourth round and against USSR side Dinamo Minsk in the  quarter-finals.

Later he moved to France to play for FC Rouen and stayed there till 1988. In June he moved to Belgium side Eendracht Aalst and stayed there for one season. He then moved to Cypriot side Aris Limassol where he played for three seasons and finished his career in 1992 at the age of 29 (not still 30 as he turned 30 in December of that year, but finished his career in May when he was still 29).

References

External links
 

1962 births
Living people
Footballers from Sarajevo
Association football wingers
Yugoslav footballers
FK Željezničar Sarajevo players
FC Rouen players
S.C. Eendracht Aalst players
Aris Limassol FC players
Yugoslav First League players
Championnat National players
Ligue 2 players
Challenger Pro League players
Cypriot First Division players
Yugoslav expatriate footballers
Expatriate footballers in France
Yugoslav expatriate sportspeople in France
Expatriate footballers in Belgium
Yugoslav expatriate sportspeople in Belgium
Expatriate footballers in Cyprus
Yugoslav expatriate sportspeople in Cyprus
Association football agents